William R. Hinkle (born August 18, 1956) is an American politician in Washington. Hinkle is a former Republican Party member of the Washington House of Representatives, representing the 13th district.

Early life 
On August 18, 1956, Hinkle was born in Tacoma, Washington.

Education 
Hinkle attended South Puget Sound Community College and Tacoma Community College. Hinkle studied advanced prehospital medicine from University of Washington. Hinkle earned a Master of Arts in Applied Theology from the University of Balamand in Lebanon.

Career 
Hinkle is a former paramedic and firefighter. In 1996, Hinkle served as a County Commissioner for Kittitas County, Washington, until 2002.

In 2002, Hinkle won the election and became a Republican Party member of Washington State House of Representatives for District 13. In November 2012, Hinkle resigned.

Hinkle is a life time member of National Rifle Association.

In 2012, Hinkle became an executive director of the Rental Housing Association of Puget Sound.

Personal life 
Hinkle's wife is Debra Hinkle, a firefighter and dispatcher. They have two children. Hinkle and his family live in Cle Elum, Washington.

References

External links 
 Bill Hinkle at ballotpedia.org
 Bill Hinkle at washingtonvotes.org

1956 births
Living people
Republican Party members of the Washington House of Representatives
People from Cle Elum, Washington
Politicians from Tacoma, Washington